James J. Godfroy (1802 – May 20, 1847) was an American politician who served one term in the Michigan House of Representatives.

Biography 

James Godfroy was born in Detroit, Michigan, in 1802.
He was educated in Bardstown, Kentucky, and studied law. He moved to Monroe soon afterwards.

Ill health forced Godfroy to abandon his law practice at an early age, and he became formed the firm P. & J.J. Godfroy with his brother Peter, and engaged in the Indian trade. He spoke English and French as well as the dialect of the area's Native American tribes, and was elected as a chief by the Pottawatomie. He exercised influence in the affairs of Monroe County residents of French descent, many of whom were illiterate. Many of them sought his advice on negotiations and real estate transactions, and also went to him for election ballots to ensure they were voting a straight Democratic ticket. He was elected to the Michigan House of Representatives in the first election after adoption of the state constitution, and served one term, through 1836.

Godfroy died in Monroe on May 20, 1847, aged 45.

Family 

He married Victoria Navarre, the daughter of Colonel Francis Navarre. They had eleven children: John, Lewis C., Frederick C., Theo S., Hillary, Philip W., Augusta F., Celestine, Alexandria, Victoria R., and Mary Therese.

Notes

References 
 
 
 
  
 

1802 births
1847 deaths
Democratic Party members of the Michigan House of Representatives
19th-century American politicians